Petavius is a large lunar impact crater located to the southeast of the Mare Fecunditatis, near the southeastern lunar limb. Attached to the northwest rim is the smaller crater Wrottesley. To the southeast are Palitzsch, Vallis Palitzsch, and Hase. Farther to the north is the large crater Vendelinus. Petavius appears oblong when viewed from the Earth due to foreshortening. Petavius is Imbrian in age.

The outer wall of Petavius is unusually wide in proportion to the diameter, and displays a double rim along the south and west sides. The height of the rim varies by as much as 50% from the lowest point, and a number of ridges radiate outwards from the rim. The convex crater floor has been resurfaced by lava flow, and displays a rille system named the Rimae Petavius. The large central mountains are a prominent formation with multiple peaks, climbing 1.7 kilometers above the floor. A deep fracture runs from the peaks toward the southwest rim of the crater.

Rev. T. W. Webb described Petavius as,

High, its terraces, and convex interior with central hill and cleft, compose a magnificent landscape in the lunar morning or evening, entirely vanishing beneath a Sun risen but halfway to the meridian."

The most favorable time for viewing this feature through a telescope is when the Moon is only three days old. By the fourth day the crater is nearly devoid of shadow.

70-cm radar images of this crater and its surroundings show that the region of the surface beyond the wide outer rampart of Petavius has a dark halo, characteristic of a smooth surface free of boulders. It is thought that this may have been created by radial outbursts during the original impact that swept the area clean.

Petavius B to the north-northwest of Petavius has a small ray system that lies across the surface of Mare Fecunditatis.  Due to these rays, Petavius B is mapped as part of the Copernican System.

Satellite craters 

By convention these features are identified on lunar maps by placing the letter on the side of the crater midpoint that is closest to Petavius.

Views

References 

 Rev. T. W. Webb, Celestial Objects for Common Telescopes, rev. 6, Dover, 1962, .
 Ghent and others, Properties of Lunar Crater Ejecta from New 70 cm Radar Observations, 2004, Lunar & Planetary Science 35; #1879.

External links 
 Lunar Orbiter 5 acquired high-resolution images of Petavius: Frame 033, Frame 034, Frame 035, and Frame 036
 
 
 
 

Impact craters on the Moon